Ceri Jones is a former Welsh international rugby union player. Normally a loose-head prop forward he could also play tight-head prop.

Jones played for Newport High School Old Boys, Usk and Newport before making his name at Harlequins.  He originally joined Quins on loan from Newport in February 2003, before signing a full-time contract at the end of the 2002–03 season.  He made his debut in the Premiership fixture away to Bristol Shoguns in March 2003 and went on to make over 200 top-flight appearances.

Ceri played for Worcester Warriors. He suffered a serious Achilles injury against Saracens on 14 April 2013 and is undergoing long-term rehabilitation. Amid concerns about his future playing career, he was confirmed as Scrum Coach at Worcester.

In 2016 he Joined Dragons as forwards coach

Jones attained his first Wales cap in the 29–23 loss to Australia in Sydney on 26 May 2007. His second and final cap came a week later when he started against Australia.

References

External links
Quins' new prop

1977 births
Living people
Rugby union players from Newport, Wales
Welsh rugby union players
Newport RFC players
Harlequin F.C. players
Worcester Warriors players
Newport HSOB RFC players
Wales international rugby union players
Rugby union props